State Road 160 (FL 160) is a  state highway in Tallahassee, Leon County, Florida, that connects Florida State Road 61 and County Road 0352 and U.S. Route 319 north of Interstate 10 in northern Tallahassee.

Major intersections

References

External links
FDOT Map of Leon County (Including SR 160)

160
160
Transportation in Tallahassee, Florida
State highways in the United States shorter than one mile